Sinodendron rugosum is a species of the family Lucanidae, the stag beetles. It is commonly referred to as the rugose stag beetle, and is the only known member of the genus Sinodendron to occur in western North America.

Description
The adults of this species exhibit sexual dimorphism, a common trait in Lucanidae, as well as unopposable clubbed antennae. The pronotum and elytra are covered in many small pits, leading to an overall rugose appearance. The head of the male is much narrower than the pronotum, and has a short, median rhinoceros-like horn. The female either lacks a horn or has a small median tubercle.

Range
Sinodendron rugosum is found in moist woodlands from British Columbia to California. Adults are commonly found on the ground from spring to early summer.

Life history
The white, C-shaped larvae hatch on bark and tunnel inward, creating pupal chambers in decaying wood. They have been associated with oak, alder, willow and cherry. Adults may feed on plant juices or aphid honeydew. The horn of the male is occasionally used in combat with other males in order to establish dominance when competing for mates.

Predators
Sinodendron rugosum has been identified as one of many species eaten by the Northern Spotted Owl Strix occidentalis.

References

External links

Syndesinae
Beetles of North America
Beetles described in 1843